Daphne van Domselaar (born 6 March 2000) is a Dutch professional footballer who plays as a goalkeeper for Eredivisie club Twente and the Netherlands national team.

Club career

Youth career
At the age of 11, Daphne van Domselaar started playing football at LSVV in Zuid-Scharwoude. In the team that she joined, the girls played without a regular keeper. However, after Van Domselaar took her turn as goalkeeper, she did not leave that position but stayed in it. The LSVV goalkeeping coach immediately recognised her great talent. Moreover, he noted that she had learned a lot at the volleyball club which she had come from. Van Domselaar then played for four years with the boys of LSVV and for two years with Telstar's youth academy.

In her second year at Telstar, she was the one-off reserve keeper of the senior team in their away match against PSV on 4 February 2017. Telstar continued as VV Alkmaar in the following season. Soccerway erroneously reports that Van Domselaar played with VV Alkmaar in the 2016/17 season.

Senior career
Van Domselaar started her professional career with FC Twente in the 2017/18 season. In the first two seasons she was reserve goalkeeper behind Nicky Evrard. She made her debut in the Eredivisie on 22 December 2017 in the match against Heerenveen, when after 20 minutes Evrard was shown a red card. From the 2019/20 season, Van Domselaar was FC Twente's first-choice goalkeeper.

Her first trainer at FC Twente, Tommy Stroot, called her a “pure natural talent”. After the UEFA Women's Euro 2022 championship, various foreign clubs were interested in Van Domselaar, but she decided to stay with FC Twente for the 2022/23 season. She did say that she hoped for a transfer to “a very nice club outside the Netherlands” in 2023. At the end of 2022, she was the only Eredivisie player included in The Guardian's annual list of the 100 best female football players in the world.

International career
Van Domselaar’s first cap was for a friendly against Belgium U15 on 18 March 2015. The UEFA Women's Under-17 Championship in May 2017 was her first major tournament. With the Dutch team she reached the semifinals. Her performance in the Netherlands U17 team drew the attention of Tommy Stroot, who brought her to FC Twente in the summer of 2017.

Van Domselaar made her senior team debut during the Tournoi de France on 19 February 2022 in a 3–0 win against Finland. In July 2022, she was named in the Dutch squad for the European Championship held in England. In the first group match against Sweden, the starting goalkeeper Sari van Veenendaal was injured, and Van Domselaar came on as a substitute in the 20th minute. She played in goal for the rest of the tournament. Up to and including the quarterfinals, in which the Netherlands team were eliminated by France, she was the star player of the Dutch national team.

Career statistics

Club

International

Honours
Twente
 Eredivisie: 2018–19, 2020–21, 2021–22
 Eredivisie Cup: 2019–20, 2021–22
 Dutch Women's Super Cup: 2022

References

External links
 
 
Daphne van Domselaar at soccerdonna.de
Senior national team profile at Onsoranje.nl (in Dutch)
Under-23 national team profile at Onsoranje.nl (in Dutch)
Under-19 national team profile at Onsoranje.nl (in Dutch)
Under-17 national team profile at Onsoranje.nl (in Dutch)
Under-16 national team profile at Onsoranje.nl (in Dutch)
Under-15 national team profile at Onsoranje.nl (in Dutch)

2000 births
Living people
Women's association football goalkeepers
Dutch women's footballers
Netherlands women's international footballers
Eredivisie (women) players
FC Twente (women) players
UEFA Women's Euro 2022 players
Sportspeople from Beverwijk
Footballers from North Holland